Pokegama is an unincorporated community in Pokegama Township, Pine County, Minnesota, United States; along the Pokegama Lake.  Its name in Ojibwe is Bakegamaang, meaning "at the side-lake", referring to Pokegama Lake's position to the Snake River.

The community is located between Pine City and Henriette; near the intersection of Pine County 7 and Pine County 13.

History
Originally an Ojibwa village, Pokegama housed a Presbyterian Mission ran by Frederick Ayer, claiming to print the first Christian Bible in the Ojibwe language in Minnesota.

As of 2004, Pokegama held the Minnesota state record low temperature records for March (-49 F in 1897), November (-45 F in 1896), and December (-57 F in 1898).

References

Unincorporated communities in Minnesota
Unincorporated communities in Pine County, Minnesota